The Shakespeare in Washington Festival was a cultural festival held in Washington, D.C. from January through June 2007 in honor of the works of William Shakespeare.

More than 40 arts organizations from Washington and around the world are participated in Shakespeare in Washington, a festival featuring a vast array of theater, music, and dance, as well as films, art exhibits, and many other events at the Kennedy Center and other venues across the D.C. area.

This event was conceived by Michael M. Kaiser, president of the Kennedy Center, and was curated by Michael Kahn, artistic director of the Shakespeare Theatre Company.

Participating international organizations

Cameri Theatre of Israel
Kirov Ballet
Kirov Opera and Orchestra
Dame Cleo Laineand Sir John Dankworth,
The Nash Ensemble of London
The Royal Shakespeare Company

Participating national organizations

Alexandria Symphony Orchestra
American Ballet Theatre
American Film Institute
Cathedral Choral Society
The Chesapeake Shakespeare Company
Folger Shakespeare Library and Theatre
Folger Consort
The John F. Kennedy Center for the Performing Arts
The National Archives
National Building Museum
National Gallery of Art
National Museum of American History
National Museum of the American Indian,
National Portrait Gallery
National Symphony Orchestra
New York City Ballet
The Phillips Collection
The Shakespeare Guild
The Shakespeare Theatre Company
Signature Theatre
Smithsonian Jazz Masterworks Orchestra
The Studio Theatre
The Suzanne Farrell Ballet
Synetic Theatre
Theatre J
The University of Maryland, College Park Center for Renaissance and Baroque Studies
Vocal Arts Society
VSA arts
The Washington Ballet
Washington Concert Opera
Washington National Opera
Washington Performing Arts Society
The Washington Savoyards
Washington Shakespeare Company
Woolly Mammoth Theatre Company

References 
 Kennedy Center: Shakespeare in Washington Festival

Festivals in Washington, D.C.
Shakespeare festivals in the United States